The Powers of Matthew Star is an American sci-fi television series that aired on NBC on Friday evenings from September 17, 1982 until April 8, 1983. It starred Peter Barton as the title character, the alien prince Matthew "E'Hawke" Star of the planet Quadris, who used his powers to fight crime. Also starring were Amy Steel as Pam Elliot, Matthew’s girlfriend at Crestridge High; and Louis Gossett Jr. as Walt "D'Hai" Shepherd, Matthew’s guardian.

In 2002, The Powers of Matthew Star was ranked #22 on the list of TV Guide'''s "50 Worst TV Shows of All Time".

On June 7, 2020, the program began airing in syndication on Sunday mornings at 6:00 am as part of MeTV's Super SciFi Saturday Night block.

Series history
The show was created by Steven E. de Souza, and developed by Daniel Wilson, Harve Bennett, Robert Earll, and Allan Balter. Wilson, Bennett and Bruce Lansbury were the executive producers. Star Trek actors worked behind the scenes in a few episodes: Leonard Nimoy directed the episode "Triangle", and Walter Koenig wrote the episode "Mother".

The series underwent numerous title changes during development. These included Starr Knight, Star Prince, Knight Star, The Powers of David Star, The Powers of Daniel Star, and finally The Powers of Matthew Star. The original pilot (Starr Knight) was to deal with teenager David Star, who lived with the school janitor, Max (Gerald S. O'Loughlin). Max had a secret he was not sharing with David, who had no idea that he and Max were from another planet. As his powers began to surface, David started to understand who he was. Hot on their trail was the FBI. The original pilot was aired as the last episode of the series. As an example of one of the late title changes of the series, the Canadian issue of TV Guide's 1981 Fall Preview issue listed it as The Powers of Daniel Star with a full-page photo and paragraph, whereas US versions gave the series a half-page blurb with the correct title The Powers of Matthew Star. To add to the confusion, the actual writeup in the Canadian issues correctly referred to ‘Matthew Star,’ meaning they did get the memo of the latest name change but failed to update the header at the top of the page. 

The program, originally slated to debut with the 1981 fall season with the new title and storyline, was delayed when on November 12, 1981, Peter Barton fell backward onto pyrotechnics and was badly burned, while co-star Louis Gossett Jr., tied to a chair, had fallen on top of Barton but managed to rescue him. After a month in the hospital, Barton was released, recovering at home while the show's production was shut down for four months. The series resumed shooting in early March, 1982. 

The series was cancelled after one season.

Plot

Introduction
D'Hai/Walt Shepherd's (Louis Gossett Jr.) dialogue over the opening theme tells the tale of E'Hawke/Matthew Star (Peter Barton):

First half of series
The first half of the series' run dealt with Matthew Star attending Crestridge High School and trying to survive his teenage years while dodging assassins, all under the watchful eye of his guardian, Walt Shepherd, who stayed nearby as a science teacher at the school. Those in their lives who had no idea about the truth were Matthew's girlfriend Pam Elliot (Amy Steel), his friend Bob Alexander (Chip Frye), and the merry principal, Mr. Heller (Michael Fairman).

General Tucker (John Crawford), a U.S. Air Force officer specializing in extraterrestrial investigations, had tracked the two of them across the country as they evaded alien agents intent on exterminating them. From time to time, he enlisted their specialized aid in solving monumental problems.

The first dozen episodes dealt with the daily troubles of high school students, although in the episode "The Triangle," a chance trip to the Bermuda Triangle resulted in the discovery of Quadrian messengers, who told the pair that the king had been executed. E'Hawke/Matthew was crowned the new king in a torch-lit cave.

In the episode "Mother," a strange carnival gypsy is revealed to be Matthew's mother, Nadra, who had been traveling the galaxy and hiding from assassins. This reunion was bittersweet; due to Nadra's health problems, she was forced to leave Crestridge for an undisclosed location at a higher elevation.

Finally, in the "Fugitives" episode, Walt, trying to elude a nosy doctor, comes into contact with a substance in the hospital that causes him to have a deadly allergic reaction. At the same time, Matthew is being booked into jail and needs Walt to bail him out. At the last minute, Matthew manages to save Walt as he has done many times throughout the series.

Matthew's powers during this season were mainly telekinetic, being able to move objects with the power of his mind. This power was illustrated in the opening credits as moving a book back into a slot on a bookshelf. In episodes, he used telekinesis to manipulate a football, and raise rocks that had buried an experimental Air Force flying unit and then its simulation. The opening title suggests that members of his family had other powers that probably expanded after achieving physical maturity (and with practice).

Second half of series
The series took a sudden turn from a dramatic adventure series to a by-the-book adventure series, with Walt and Matthew having to deal with government assignments. Major Wymore (James Karen) replaced General Tucker (John Crawford) and met with the Quadrians in all sorts of strange locations, where he briefed them on the missions. Gone were Pam and Bob and references to the high school. Matthew was being portrayed as older, and not much was said about their true mission, which was returning to Quadris to take back their world from the enemy.

Matthew had previously used the nickname "Shep" for his guardian, but with the sudden format change, Matthew started calling him Walt.

In the gap between episodes 12 and 13, Matthew apparently developed or perfected additional powers, including separating his intelligence into an "astral," a simulation of his current appearance that could walk through walls (as in astral projection). Another power was transmutation of objects.

Enemies of Quadris
The name of the Marauder species that attacked Quadris is unrevealed. They seem human, but tend to explode when they hit water. These 'human replicants' may just be service drones working for a real enemy, an image of which may have been seen in the first pilot (when "Matthew" was "David"). Why the Marauders would invade Quadris but not Earth is not known. However, it may have to do with powers the Quadrians possess. They do seem to have incredible strength, and the Marauder in the second pilot, played by Judson Scott, mentioned someone named 'Olan', who gave them chemicals to feel pleasure; the character 'Olan' is never revealed.

Main cast
 Peter Barton – Matthew Star/E'Hawke
 Louis Gossett Jr. – Walt Shepherd/D'Hai
 Amy Steel – Pamela Elliot
 Chip Frye – Bob Alexander
 Michael Fairman – Principal Heller
 John Crawford – General Tucker
 James Karen – Major Wymore

Production credits
 Created by Steven E. De Souza
 Executive Producers: Daniel Wilson, Harve Bennett, and Bruce Lansbury
 Developed by Robert Earll and Allan Balter

Episode list

US TV ratings

Home media
In 2018, Visual Entertainment Inc. (VEI) released the complete series on DVD.

In June 2020, the series began airing in reruns on MeTV.

See also
 Benji, Zax and the Alien Prince Sym-Bionic Titan''

References

External links
 
 Clip of series intro

NBC original programming
1982 American television series debuts
1983 American television series endings
1980s American high school television series
1980s American science fiction television series
English-language television shows
Television series about teenagers
Television series by CBS Studios
Television shows set in New York City
Television series created by Steven E. de Souza
Television series about alien visitations
Works about princes
United States Air Force in fiction
Television series about the United States Air Force